Morten Skaget (born on 12 August 1960 in Trondheim, Norway), most commonly known by his former stage name Morty Black, is a bassist best known for playing with international bands like JORN, Ken Hensley, Terje Rypdal and TNT. He has also played for many famous Norwegian artists and has also been a bassist for Mariah Carey. He also plays drums and once played the ride cymbal in the TNT song "Seven Seas". Away from music he is the father of three children. His stepson, Ståle Stiil, was the first rapper to sing lyrics in Norwegian with his album Yo! in 1992.

Discography

TNT
 Knights of the New Thunder (1984)
 Tell No Tales (1987)
 Intuition (1989)
 Realized Fantasies (1992)
 Three Nights in Tokyo (Live) (1992)
 Firefly (1997)
 Transistor (1999)
 Give me a Sign EP (2003)
 My Religion (2004)

Vagabond
Vagabond (1994)
A Huge Fan of Life (1995)

JORN
The Duke (2006)
The Gathering (2007)
Unlocking the Past (2007)

Tony Mills
Vital Designs (2008)

Stargazer
Stargazer (2009)

Northward
Northward (2018)

References

External links
Morty Black's official site

Norwegian bass guitarists
Norwegian male bass guitarists
TNT (Norwegian band) members
Living people
1960 births
Musicians from Trondheim
Norwegian multi-instrumentalists